Maramonovca is a village in Drochia District, Moldova. At the 2004 census, the commune had 2,666 inhabitants.

References

Villages of Drochia District
Shtetls
Former Jewish agricultural colonies of Bessarabia